Lon bin Mohamed Noor (born 1921) was a Singaporean weightlifter. He competed in the men's bantamweight event at the 1952 Summer Olympics.

References

External links
 

1921 births
Possibly living people
Singaporean male weightlifters
Olympic weightlifters of Singapore
Weightlifters at the 1952 Summer Olympics
Place of birth missing
Weightlifters at the 1951 Asian Games
Asian Games competitors for Singapore
Singaporean people of Malay descent
20th-century Singaporean people